Orientus is a genus of leafhoppers belonging to the family Cicadellidae subfamily Deltocephalinae.

Selected species
 Orientus ishidae (Matsumura, 1902) - Japanese Leafhopper

Bibliography
 A. Guglielmino Observations on the genus Orientus (Rhynchota Cicadomorpha Cicadellidae) and description of a new species: O. amurensis n. sp. from Russia (Amur Region and Maritime Territory) and China (Liaoning Province)

References 

 Biolib

Cicadellidae genera
Athysanini